Odd Ørnulf Hoel (21 May 1909 – 5 February 1979) was a Norwegian footballer who played for SFK Lyn. He was capped four times for the Norway national football team between 1932 and 1935, scoring four goals.

Career statistics

International

International goals
Scores and results list Norway's goal tally first.

References

1909 births
1979 deaths
Norwegian footballers
Norway international footballers
Association football forwards
Lyn Fotball players
Sportspeople from Bærum